Attention Shoppers is a 2000 American comedy film directed by Philip Charles MacKenzie and written by Nestor Carbonell. The film stars Carbonell in the lead role, with Michael Lerner, Kathy Najimy, Martin Mull, Luke Perry, Cara Buono, Casey Affleck, and Lin Shaye in supporting roles.

Premise
An actor from a popular television sitcom agrees to appear at the grand opening of a Houston, Texas supermarket. On his journey to and during his appearance at the supermarket, he learns lessons about his career, celebrity, human nature, and his marital problems from the interesting and strange people he meets.

Cast
 Nestor Carbonell as Enrique Suarez
 Michael Lerner as Khourosh
 Kathy Najimy as Penelope
 Martin Mull as Charles
 Luke Perry as Mark Pinnalore
 Cara Buono as Claire Suarez
 Carlos Jacott as Duncan Baird
 Casey Affleck as Jed
 Lillian Adams as Gracie
 Lin Shaye as Libby
 Shannon Kenny as Shelly
 O-Lan Jones as Meg
 Mary-Pat Green as Sandwich Woman

Release
The film was given a DVD release in the United States and Canada on November 28, 2000, by MGM Home Entertainment.

Reception
Attention Shoppers received mixed reviews from critics. Nathan Rabin from The A.V. Club wrote: "As a writer, Carbonell displays a real talent for low-key observational humor, and Attention Shoppers benefits from an excellent supporting cast that includes Carlos Jacott, Kathy Najimy, Michael Lerner, and a scene-stealing Lin Shaye. But by the time Carbonell arrives at Kmart halfway in, the film's already less-than-breathless pace grinds to a halt, crippling it with a dire lack of forward momentum. Attention Shoppers isn't quite funny or compelling enough to qualify as a success, but its cast, dry comic tone, and admirable attention to detail make it one of the most interesting failures to be released directly to video this year."

References

External links
 
 

2000 films
American comedy films
Films shot in Houston
Films shot in Los Angeles
2000 comedy films
2000s English-language films
2000s American films